Shimoga Lok Sabha constituency is one of the 28 Lok Sabha (parliamentary) constituencies in Karnataka state in southern India. As of 2005 it had 1,286,181 voters, of whom Scheduled Castes and Scheduled Tribes account for more than 250,000; Lingayats for around 200,000; Deevaru for 160,000; Muslims for 150,000; and Brahmins and Vokkaligas for 105,000 and others 200,000.

Assembly segments
Shimoga Lok Sabha constituency consists of eight assembly segments. These are:

Members of Parliament

^ denotes By poll

Election Results

General Election, 2019

By Election, 2018

General Election, 2014

General Election, 2009

By Election, 2005

See also
 Shimoga district
 List of Constituencies of the Lok Sabha

References

Lok Sabha constituencies in Karnataka
Shimoga district